Anastasiya Volodymyrivna Dmytryshyn (born 22 August 1995) is a Ukrainian badminton player. She was the women's doubles champion at the 2013 Slovak Open partnered with Darya Samarchants.

Achievements

BWF International Challenge/Series 
Women's doubles

  BWF International Challenge tournament
  BWF International Series tournament
  BWF Future Series tournament

References

External links 
 

Living people
1995 births
Sportspeople from Donetsk Oblast
Ukrainian female badminton players
21st-century Ukrainian women